Kim Min-ki (born March 31, 1951) is a South Korean singer, composer, and playwright. He is best known for his 1970 song, "Morning Dew," and for his 1994 Korean adaptation of the German musical, Linie 1.

Early life and education 
Kim was born on March 31, 1951, the youngest of 10 children, in Iri (present-day Iksan), North Jeolla Provence, South Korea. His family moved to Seoul in 1963, and he enrolled in Seoul National University to study fine arts in 1969.

Career 
Kim first came to prominence as the composer of the tune "Achim Isul" (literally "Morning dew"), which was written in 1970 and performed by Korean folk singer Yang Hee-eun. The song was a major pop music hit in Korea in the 70s, and Kim became a prominent figure in blending Korean folk and pop musics, as well as an outspoken political activist and representative of youth culture. Kim's songs discussed the Americanization of Korean culture and questioned relations between North and South Korea, and his lyrical and musical style were a major influence on the genre known as Norae Undong ("Song Movement") which became popular in the 1980s. He released nine albums before 1975, at which time his music was censored by the government; his albums were pulled from record stores, playing of his music over the radio or singing it in public was banned, and he was not permitted to release material under his own name.  He composed the music for a 1981 film, The Ball Shot by a Midget, which was not permitted to be used by government censors who reviewed the film. This moratorium continued until June 26, 1987, when all restrictions on the performance of his material were lifted.

During his period of censorship, Kim turned to writing plays, which began to be performed after 1987. He also formed an acting troupe, Hakchon, which performs musicals he composed. His adaption of the German rock musical Linie 1 was first performed in 1994 and has been given over 1,000 times in Korea, as well as being performed in China and Japan. In 2007 he received the Goethe Medal.

Awards

References

South Korean folk rock musicians
South Korean songwriters
South Korean composers
Seoul National University alumni
1951 births
Living people
Recipients of the Ho-Am Prize in the Arts